Cyathodes glauca, the purple cheeseberry,  is a woody shrub or small tree common in Tasmania, Australia. It belongs to the 'heath' family, Ericaceae. 'Heath' refers to open, shrub-like communities which survive on well-drained and poor quality soils.

The word 'Cyathodes' is in reference to the flower, describing it as 'cup-shaped'. "Glauca' is derived from 'glaucous' which means blueish-grey or green, referring to the distinguishable, lighter colour on the underside of the leaves.

Description
Leaves: Dark green, linear and pointed 2–4 cm long. They have parallel venation and form false whorls, particularly towards the end of the stem. Undersides are distinctively glaucous.

Flowers: numerous, mostly terminal flowers, solitary in axils of final whorl. Slightly scented, they are small (1 cm), white and tubular with recurved lobes and protruding anthers. They flower in spring and early summer.

Fruit: a distinctively pink/purple drupe, 1 cm in diameter. Shape is that of a partially flattened tennis ball.

Distribution
Widespread and locally common understorey plant in open forest below 1100m (subalpine). It is found almost only in Tasmania, Australia, with outlying occurrences in central-east New South Wales and far southwest South Australia. It inhabits mostly subalpine, sclerophyll woodland or wet sclerophyll forest.

Ecology
Common dominant species that Cyathodes glauca occurs with are Leptospermum scoparium, Pultenaea daphnoides, Monotoca glauca and Acacia species. Cyathodes glauca prefers moist, well-drained/poor quality soil. As a result, it is often found on rocky slopes and boulder fields where clay soils overlay dolerite. Slopes are typically of a southeast aspect with gentle to moderate gradient and good drainage.

Affinities
There are three other known species within the genus Cyathodes. Cyathodes platystoma (a threatened species), has the largest leaves and is only found in wet sclerophyll forests of the Tasman Peninsula. Cyathodes straminea looks very similar to C. glauca although has smaller leaves, dark red drupes and is only found above 1100m.

Other recognisable members of the family Ericaceae include blueberries, cranberries and rhododendrons.

References

Epacridoideae
Flora of Tasmania
Trees of Australia
Taxa named by Jacques Labillardière